The Diocese of Modigliana was a Roman Catholic diocese in central Italy. In 1986 it was merged with the diocese of Faenza to create the Diocese of Faenza-Modigliana.

Bishops

Diocese of Modigliana
Erected 7 July 1850
Latin Name: Mutilensis

Mario Melini (1853-1865 Died)
Leonardo Giannotti, O.F.M. Ref. (1871-1895 Died)
Sante Mei (1895-1907 Resigned)
Luigi Capotosti (1908-1915 Appointed, Titular Bishop of Thermae Basilicae)
Ruggero Bovelli (1915-1924 Appointed, Bishop of Faenza)
Massimiliano Massimiliani (1931-1960 Died)
Antonio Ravagli (1960-1970 Resigned)
Marino Bergonzini (1970-1982 Retired)
Francesco Tarcisio Bertozzi (1982-1986 Appointed, Bishop of Faenza-Modigliana)

30 September 1986: United with the Diocese of Faenza to form the Diocese of Faenza-Modigliana

References

External links
 GCatholic.org

Former Roman Catholic dioceses in Italy